Risurrezione (Resurrection), is an opera or dramma in four acts by Franco Alfano. The libretto was written by Camillo Antona Traversi and Cesare Hanau (only Hanau signed it), based on the 1899 novel Resurrection by Leo Tolstoy.

Performance history
Risurrezione was Alfano's most successful work. For performances at La Scala Milan in March 1906, Alfano made cuts to the score. It was translated into French by Paul Ferrier and performed in Brussels, beginning on 18 April 1906. It was translated into German by A. Brüggeman and performed at the Königliche Oper in Berlin, beginning on 5 October 1909. For the Berlin production, Alfano made further revisions to the score. In Italian, it was performed in Modena (18 February 1911), Novara (18 February 1911, altered version), Madrid (21 December 1911, altered version), Santiago, Chile (summer 1928), and at the Teatro Regio in Turin (6 January 1936). It was also given in French in Nice (8 March 1925), Chicago (31 December 1925), and in Paris at the Salle Favart by the Opéra-Comique (16 May 1927 and 10 April 1934), in a production by Albert Carré. The Opéra-Comique revivals starred Mary Garden as Catarina and René Maison as Prince Dimitri. Retitled Katjuscha, it was again translated into German by E. Orthmann and H. Hartleb and performed at the Volks-Oper in Berlin on 4 October 1938. The Opéra-Comique revived Ferrier's translation again on 15 May 1954, in a new production by Jean Doat with scenery and costumes by André Bakst. The American soprano Patricia Neway sang Caterina with an otherwise all French cast. By the end of 1954, the opera had been performed more than 1,000 times around the world.

The opera was performed at Fulham Town Hall, London, on 30 November 1967. It was successfully revived at the Wexford Festival Opera, beginning on 2 November 2018. The Wexford production was performed at the Florence May Festival in January 2020, and an HD video was released in 2021.

Roles

Synopsis
Place: Russia and Siberia
Time: The end of 19th century

Act 1
Prince Dimitri arrives to say goodbye to his aunt, Sophia Ivanovna, before leaving for the war. His old playmate Katiusha, a young peasant girl, is now Sophia Ivanovna's companion. Dimitri is overjoyed to meet her again and that night becomes her lover. The next day he leaves for the war.

Act 2

The station of a small town. Katiusha, now pregnant, has been driven out of the house. She anxiously waits for Prince Dimitri who is due to pass through the station. But when she sees him arrive in the company of a prostitute, her courage fails her and she remains hidden until she goes away, pierced to her soul.

Act 3
Prison in Saint Petersburg. Katiusha, broken by Dimitri's neglect of her and the death of her child, ends up in a place of debauchery. She is involved in a crime and, although innocent, is condemned for murder during a difficult trial, and is to be deported to Siberia. Before she leaves, Dimitri, now overcome with remorse, comes to see her in jail and offers to marry her. But she is in such a state of abject despair that she refuses all consolation.

Act 4
On the road to Siberia. Katiusha has become herself again, the good sweet girl of former times. Prince Dimitri arrives. Simonson, a political prisoner, reveals he loves Katiusha, wants to marry her, and asks for the prince's consent. Dimitri says she is free to do what she wants. Dimitri shows Katiusha a letter, revealing she has been pardoned; he tells her Simonson loves her and wants to marry her, so she must choose between them. She says she will marry Simonson, because she loves him. Although she still loves Dimitri with all her soul, she tells him to leave. She has found new purpose in life helping other prisoners.

Noted arias
Si, la ravviso la mia cara stanza (Yes, I see my dear room...) – Arioso of Dimitri (Act 1)
Qualcun giù in giardino?... È Katiusha!.. (Someone is in the garden?... It's Katyusha!...) – Duetto of Katerina and Dimitri (Act 1)
Dio pietoso, fa ch'il venga alfin (Merciful Lord, make him come at last) – Aria of Katerina (Act 2)
Piangi, si, piangi (Cry, yes, cry) – Arioso of Dimitri (Act 3)
Quando la vidi, una voce mi disse (When I saw her, a voice said to me) – Aria of Simonson (Act 4)
Ed ora, va... parti!... Son felice!!! (And now, go... leave!... I'm happy!) – Finale duetto of Katerina and Dimitri (Act 4)

Orchestration
3 flutes (1 piccolo) / 3 oboes (1 English horn) / 3 clarinets (1 bass clarinet) / 2 bassoons / 1 contrabassoon
4 horns / 3 trumpets / 3 trombones / 1 tuba
timpani / percussion (cymbals / triangle / bass drum) / tubular bells / xylophone / celesta / 2 harps / piano
Violins / violas / cellos / double basses

Recordings
 1954 (monaural audio): Carla Gavazzi as Katinska, Nicola Filacuridi as Prince Dimitri; conducted by Oliviero De Fabritiis.
 1973 (monaural audio): Magda Olivero as Katiusha Mikailovna, Giuseppe Gismondo as Prince Dimitri, Antonio Boyer as Simonson, Anna Di Stasio as Matrena Pavlovna, Nucci Condo as Anna, Vera Magrini as La Korableva, Patrizia Pace as Fedia, Marco Stafoni as Head Warden; Turin RAI Chorus and Orchestra, conducted by Elio Boncompagni; audio recording of a radio broadcast of 22 October 1971. Also includes a 1985 audio recording of the final scene of Turandot with Linda Kelm as Turandot and Jon Frederic West as Calaf, conducted by Christopher Keene.
 2020 (HD video): Anne Sophie Duprels as Katerina Mihaylovna (Katyusha), Matthew Vickers as Prince Dimitri Ivanovitch Nehlyudov, Leon Kim as Simonson, Francesca Di Sauro as Sofia Ivanovna, Romina Tomasoni as Matryova Pavlovna/Anna, Nadia Pirazzini as Maidservant, Ana Victória Pitts as Vera/Korablyova, Barbara Marcacci as Fenyichka; Orchestra and Chorus of the Florence May Festival, conducted by Francesco Lanzillotta; stage director: Rosetta Cucchi; video director: Davide Mancini; recorded live on 17 and 21 January, 2020, Dynamic.

See also
 Tod Machover, composer of the 1999 opera Resurrection, also based on Tolstoy's novel

References

Sources
 Ashman, Mike (2021). Review of Alfano Risurrezione, Gramophone, May 2021, p. 74.
 Brown, William R. (2021). "Recordings > Opera and Oratorio: Alfano: Risurrezione", Opera News, vol. 86, no. 2 (August 2021).
 Kellow, Brian (2018). "In Review: Margherita, Risurrezione, Medea, Wexford Festival Opera", Opera News, vol. 82, no. 8 (February 2018).
 Loewenberg, Alfred (1978). Annals of Opera 1597–1940 (third edition, revised). Totowa, New Jersey: Rowman and Littlefield. .
 Maehder, Jürgen (1992). "Risurrezione", vol. 3, in The New Grove Dictionary of Opera, four volumes, edited by Stanley Sadie. London: Macmillan. .
 Oliver, Michael (1993). "Alfano Risurrezione", Gramophone, October 1993, p. 110.
 Orselli, Cesare (2021). "Risurrezione by Franco Alfano",  (English translation by Daniela Pilarz), in the booklet accompanying the Dynamic video recording. Blu-ray: . DVD: .
 Waterhouse, John C. G. (2001). "Franco Alfano", pp. 11–12, in The New Penguin Opera Guide, edited by Amanda Holden. London: Penguin Books. .
 Wolff, Stéphane (1953). Un demi-siècle d'Opéra-Comique (1900-1950). Paris: André Bonne.

External links 

 Libretto of Risurrezione on operalibretto.com

Operas by Franco Alfano
Italian-language operas
Verismo operas
Operas
1904 operas
Operas based on novels
Operas set in Russia
Operas based on works by Leo Tolstoy